Restormel was a non-metropolitan district in Cornwall, England. It was abolished on 1 April 2009 and replaced by Cornwall Council.

Political control
The first election to the council was held in 1973, initially operating as a shadow authority before coming into its powers on 1 April 1974. Political control of the council from 1973 until the council's abolition in 2009 was held by the following parties:

Leadership
The leaders of the council from 2005 until the council's abolition were:

Council elections
1973 Restormel Borough Council election
1976 Restormel Borough Council election
1979 Restormel Borough Council election
1983 Restormel Borough Council election (New ward boundaries)
1987 Restormel Borough Council election
1991 Restormel Borough Council election
1995 Restormel Borough Council election
1999 Restormel Borough Council election
2003 Restormel Borough Council election (New ward boundaries)
2007 Restormel Borough Council election

By-election results

References

Restormel election results
By-election results

External links
Restormel Council

 
Restormel
Council elections in Cornwall
District council elections in England